Lorton, a parish in the district of Allerdale of the English county of Cumbria, consists of two adjacent villages: Low Lorton and High Lorton. Both nestle at the northern end of the Vale of Lorton, surrounded by fells such as Grasmoor, Hopegill Head and Whiteside. They are about 4 miles (6.5 km) from Cockermouth, which gives access to the main A66 road. Other nearby places include Loweswater and Brigham.

Tourism
Lorton is relatively untouched by tourism, but many pass through on the way to the Buttermere valley. There are several hill walks available. For instance, Hopegill Head can be climbed from High Lorton and Fellbarrow from Low Lorton. Of interest are the 12th-century St Cuthbert's Church and the 1663 pele tower, but the latter is closed to the public. Lorton's ancient Yew Tree is the subject of a poem by Wordsworth.

The Whinlatter Pass road connects Lorton with Braithwaite. The main road passing through Lorton links Cockermouth with Buttermere and Loweswater.

The villages
The villages have 114 households, on an area of 5,501 acres (2226 ha). Lorton has a small primary school, St Cuthbert's Church, a re-opened shop and coffee bar, a tennis club, and an award-winning pub, The Wheatsheaf Inn. It has had a community in Fairfax County, Virginia, United States, named after it.

Population
At the 2001 census, Lorton had a population of 250: 114 male and 136 female. The dominant age groups are 45–64 (71 persons) and 25–44 (61 persons), and the mean age 44.72 years. The figures changed little at the 2011 Census.

Lorton is fairly isolated: residents travel an average of 17 miles (28 km) to their jobs; 102 people aged 16–74 are economically active and only 6 unemployed.

History

Etymology
The second element in the name "Lorton" is from the Old English "tūn" meaning farmstead or village, but the first is enigmatic. Experts have suggested the Old Norse river name "Hlóra", meaning roaring, as with the Norwegian "Lora". The roaring may refer to the Whit Beck or to the River Cocker.

Agriculture and brewing
In 1811, Lorton peaked in prosperity and population due to high demand for farm products as England recovered from the Napoleonic Wars (1803–1815). Most residents were employed across the six farms, including one attached to the 17th-century New House. These were powered by fast-flowing tributaries of the River Cocker, running the length of the valley. Most houses and cottages started as barns and mills. Church records indicate a post-war depression from 1816 to 1830, with a population decrease of about 50 and smaller numbers of marriages.

Jennings Brewery was set up in Lorton in 1828 by John Jennings and brewed here exclusively until 1874.

Lorton Park is a Grade II Listed Regency House owned in the 19th century by Richard Harbord, a Liverpool shipping magnate buried in the parish church. In 1863, Prince Arthur visited Lorton Park and planted a commemorative chestnut tree in the gardens.

The novelist and agricultural writer and activist Doreen Wallace (1897–1989) was born in Lorton.

Historical mentions
Lorton features in the Imperial Gazetteer of England and Wales (1870–1872) by John Marius Wilson as "a village, a township, and a parish in Cockermouth district, Cumberland". Wilson gave some early key statistics on the value of real property (£3,288), the head count (456) and the area (5264 acres, 2130 ha). Lorton was mentioned some 15 years later in the Gazetteer of the British Isles (1887) by John Bartholomew, whose figures show some changes: the population down by 59 at 397 and the area up by 54 acres at 5318 acres (2152 ha).

William Wordsworth, the poet born in Cockermouth, immortalised the Lorton Yew Tree in his poem "Yew Trees" in 1804. It is judged to be at least 1000 years old, but was severely damaged by a storm shortly after the poem was written.

See also

Listed buildings in Lorton, Cumbria

References

External links

Cumbria County History Trust: Lorton (nb: provisional research only – see Talk page)

Villages in Cumbria
Allerdale
Civil parishes in Cumbria